Luigi Malabrocca (22 June 1920 – 1 October 2006) was an Italian road cyclist.

He formed a rivalry with Sante Carollo for the Maglia nera at the Giro d'Italia. He 'won' the rivalry, earning the jersey twice to Carollo's once.

While noted for his rivalry, he was also an accomplished cyclist. He won the Italian National Cyclo-cross Championships in 1951 and 1953, as well as winning the 1947 Paris-Nantes, the 1948 Coppa Ugo Agostoni and the 1949 Tour of Yugoslavia.

Major results

1943
 6th Giro di Romagna
1946
 9th Giro dell'Appennino
1947
 1st Paris–Nantes
 3rd Trofeo Baracchi
1948
 1st Coppa Agostoni
1949
 1st Overall Tour of Yugoslavia
1950
 3rd National Cyclo-cross Championships
 3rd Overall Tour of Yugoslavia
1951
 1st  National Cyclo-cross Championships
 1st Gran Premio dell'Epifania
1953
 1st  National Cyclo-cross Championships
 1st Gran Premio dell'Epifania
 8th Tre Valli Varesine
1954
 3rd National Cyclo-cross Championships

References

Italian male cyclists
1920 births
2006 deaths
Cyclo-cross cyclists
People from Tortona
Cyclists from Piedmont
Sportspeople from the Province of Alessandria